The Orekhovskaya Organized Crime Group was a powerful criminal organization based in Moscow active between the late 1980s and early 2000s.

History
The gang was founded in 1988 and was made up primarily of former young sportsmen between 18 and 25. The gang's leader was Sergey Timofeev, nicknamed "Sylvester" after Sylvester Stallone for his muscular build. Todorov established contacts with other prominent underworld figures such as Vyacheslav Ivankov and Sergei Mikhailov.

In 1989 the gang merged with the Solntsevskaya bratva to combat the growing threat of Chechen mafia gangs. However, by 1997 the alliance had split and Todorov was again running an independent gang. The gang also acquired a reputation of disregarding codes of conduct in the criminal underworld, starting and ending conflicts as they pleased.

At the start of the 1990s the gang was the second most powerful crime gang of Moscow Region and Russia.

In 1993 the group got into conflict with other russian gangs and killed mobster Viktor Kogan, who was moving in on their territory.

On September 13, 1994, the gang split into around a dozen warring factions. These all gradually faded away over time and what was left of the gang was swallowed up by the Solntsevskaya Bratva.

In 2005 eleven former gang members were sentenced to up to 53 years for their involvement in 264 brutal murders, including that of notorious hitman Alexander Solonik. The gang altogether are believed to be responsible for at least 6800 murders.

References

See also 
 Russian mafia
 Izmaylovskaya gang
 Solntsevskaya Bratva

Organizations established in 1988
1988 establishments in Russia
Organizations disestablished in the 2000s
2000s disestablishments in Russia
Factions of the Russian Mafia